The 2010 World Lacrosse Championship was held between 15–24 July. This international men's field lacrosse tournament organized by the Federation of International Lacrosse took place in Manchester, United Kingdom. This was the third time that the tournament was played in Greater Manchester, after the 1978 and 1994 championships.

The United States captured their ninth gold medal, defeating Canada 12–10 in the championship game. Paul Rabil of Team USA was named tournament MVP. Australia earned its fourth-straight bronze medal by defeating Japan 16 –9.

A record 29 nations competed at the event, eight more than the 2006 WLC in London, Ontario. The 101 games were held at the Armitage Centre, Manchester University's sports grounds.

For the first time, a FIL World Lacrosse Festival ran alongside the world championships from 17 to 22 July. 48 teams from around the world competed in 8 divisions from U16 to Grand Masters.

Iroquois passport controversy

The Iroquois Nationals' participation in the championships was prevented in a dispute over their passports. The team sought to travel on Haudenosaunee passports, but the United Kingdom government would not allow it because of increased passport security requirements. The United States Department of State initially also refused to allow the passports, but later granted the team a one-time waiver to travel to the tournament. However, the U.K. would not issue the team visas.

Initially, the Iroquois were hoping to be able to travel, and agreed to forfeit their first game against England. Because it was the opening game of the tournament, organizers arranged for the host team to play Germany in an exhibition match instead. However, just before game time, the FIL decided to move Germany to the Blue Division and the Iroquois to the Plum Division, making the England-Germany match an official one. The Iroquois team did not officially withdraw from the tournament, and would have been allowed to play its remaining games should it have resolved its passport difficulties in time. On 18 July, the FIL announced that the competition schedule had progressed too far to allow Iroquois to compete in the tournament. Each of the other three Plum Division teams were given 1–0 forfeit victories over the Iroquois team.

Pool play
For pool play, nations were separated into seven divisions according to strength, the top six teams were placed in the Blue Division, and the other teams were put in six divisions of four. Each of the thirty nations were eligible to win the championship. Each division played round-robin games for ranking to determine which tournament brackets they would be placed in.

Blue Division
The Blue Division originally consisted of the top six teams from the 2006 World Lacrosse Championship, but Germany was moved up to replace the missing Iroquois team. The first and second place teams from the Blue Division advanced to the tournament semifinals. The third and fourth place teams advanced to the quarterfinals. The fifth and sixth place teams were placed into the 5th through 8th place classification bracket.

Canada's 10–9 win over the United States marked the first time that the American team lost a preliminary round game in any world championship, and only its third loss overall. Both teams ended up advancing to the semifinals.

Japan, Australia, and England all finished 2–3 in the Blue Division and 1–1 in head-to-head matches against each other. All three games between the teams were close, with two going into overtime. Japan and Australia advanced to the quarterfinals based on goal differential in those matches.

Orange Division

Plum Division

Iroquois forfeited their three games due to not being able to travel to the tournament.

Yellow Division

Red Division

Turquoise Division

Grey Division

Intermediate Round
Starting on 19 July, all teams except for the Blue Division moved to one of three intermediate brackets: either the upper, middle, or lower bracket.

Upper bracket
The upper bracket included the six first-place finishers from each division as well as the top two second-place finishers. These teams were still eligible for the World Championship and could have finished anywhere from 1st to 16th in the tournament. By winning two games in the upper bracket, Scotland and Netherlands advanced to the quarterfinals.

Middle bracket
The middle bracket included the remaining four second-place finishers and the top four third-place finishers.  These teams could have finished anywhere from 9th to 24th in the final rankings.

Lower bracket
The lower bracket included the remaining two third-place finishers and the six fourth-place finishers. These teams could have finished no higher than 17th in the final rankings.

Play-in games

On 21 July, Finland beat Poland 13–7 to advance to the 9th–12th place bracket, sending Poland to the 13th–16th place bracket. Italy beat Switzerland 7–6 to advance to the 17th–20th place bracket, while Switzerland entered the 21st–24th place bracket.

Championship bracket

Classification brackets

5th to 8th place

9th to 12th place

13th to 16th place

17th to 20th place

21st to 24th place

25th to 28th place

Final standings

See also
 World Lacrosse, the unified governing body for world lacrosse
 World Lacrosse Championship
 Field lacrosse

References

External links
 Official Website (archived), mirror
 Lacrosse World Championships 2010 at Activity Workshop
 Federation of International Lacrosse

World Lacrosse Championship
World Lacrosse Championship
International lacrosse competitions hosted by England
2010s in Manchester
World Lacrosse Championship
International sports competitions in Manchester